The Sajikdan is a Korean Neo-Confucian altar located in Seoul, South Korea used to perform the national soil and grain ceremonies during the Joseon Dynasty.

A founding element of the Joseon capital

Along with the royal palace (Gyeongbokgung) and the Jongmyo shrine, the Sajik shrine is a fundamental symbol of the new capital city created during its first year. It is located west of the palace, at the feet of Inwangsan, in the neighborhood of Seochon, and gave its name to the Sajik park that surrounds it, as well as to its administrative neighborhood Sajik-dong.

On this square altar were honored on key moments of the lunar calendar the national deities of earth (Sa) and grains (Jik). 

Certain ceremonies have been recently revived in the square altars, to mirror the rites of Jongmyo jerye, now on the UNESCO's list of Masterpieces of the Oral and Intangible Heritage of Humanity.

See also
 Esplanade of Sacrifice to the Heaven and Earth 
 Shejitan, Beijing

References

External links
서울사직단(seoul社稷壇)(in Korean) at the Seoul Metropolitan Government site.

Korean Confucianism
Treasures of South Korea
Jongno District
Historic Sites of South Korea
Buildings and structures in Seoul
Tourist attractions in Seoul